Bathurst Airport may refer to:

 Bathurst Airport (New South Wales) in Bathurst, New South Wales, Australia (IATA: BHS, ICAO: YBTH)
 Bathurst Airport (New Brunswick) in Bathurst, New Brunswick, Canada (IATA: ZBF, ICAO: CZBF)